Clapper is an unincorporated community in Monroe County, in the U.S. state of Missouri.

History
A post office called Clapper was established in 1872, and remained in operation until 1906. The community has the name of Henry Clapper, a railroad promoter.

References

Unincorporated communities in Monroe County, Missouri
Unincorporated communities in Missouri